Ugo A. Perego is a population geneticist whose main focuses of study have been the origins of Native Americans and the DNA of Joseph Smith, among others. Perego is also a member of the Church of Jesus Christ of Latter-day Saints.

He has received a BSc and MSc in health sciences from Brigham Young University (Provo, Utah) and a PhD in genetics and biomolecular sciences from the University of Pavia (Pavia, Italy) under the mentorship of Antonio Torroni. Perego has lectured extensively internationally, authoring and co-authoring numerous articles on the use of DNA to research ancient population migrations, genealogies, and history, including Mormon history (Complete list of publications).

For twelve years, Perego was a senior researcher at the Sorenson Molecular Genealogy Foundation (SMGF) and a scientific consultant for GeneTree, both located in Salt Lake City, Utah. He is currently the director of the Rome Italy Institute of Religion, and a visiting scientist at the University of Perugia in Italy.

Perego is the owner of The Genetic Genealogy Consultant. He teaches an online course in genetic genealogy at Salt Lake Community College.

Sources
Article mentioning Perego's work on the genetic origins of Native Americans
FairMormon Bio
Deseret News, March 22, 2012
Deseret News, July 9, 2011
Deseret News, August 8, 2008
Genetic Genealogist article on Perego
National Geographic article that quotes Perego on the genetic origins of Native Americans
NPR article mentioning Perego
Associated Press, March 13, 2008
Ancestry Magazine, May-June 2008 article mentioning Perego
Book of Mormon and DNA Studies
Article by Perego in online journal Interpreter: A Journal of Mormon Scriptures
Full list of scientific publications on PubMed.org

Notes 

Brigham Young University alumni
Italian geneticists
Italian Latter Day Saints
Living people
Salt Lake Community College people
University of Pavia alumni
Year of birth missing (living people)